Korni (Roots) is a Russian pop rock band. They rose to fame when they won best band on the show Star Factory-1. The current band members include: Dmitry Pakulichev (vocal), Alexandr Berdnikov (vocal), and Alexey Kabanov (keyboards).

History

2002–2003: Formation and debut album 
The group was created during the project "Star Factory 1" and became the winner at the end of 2002. In 2003, the group represented Russia at the international music contest "Eurobest" in Cannes, where it won sixth place with the song "We Will Rock You" by Queen. In December of the same year the band released their debut album "For the Ages" (Russian: На Века).

2005–2006 
On the eve of 2005 the band released a music video for the song "Happy New Year, people! At the same time the band was working on their second album "Diaries", which was presented in May 2005 in an ordinary Moscow school № 547. At the same time, the band released a music video for the song "25th Floor". In the fall of 2005, they re-released the "Diaries" album with a bonus track "Back to School."

In April 2006 the band released a single "Want me to sing to you," the video for which was released in May the same year, filmed by the leading Ukrainian music video maker Viktor Priduvalov, who decided to connect the story clips of the band "Korni" and Victoria Daineko.

In August 2006, the band released a music video for the song "Race against the Wind," which became the soundtrack for the TV series "Cadet Corps" on STS Channel.

2007–2011: Artemyev and Astashenok's departure and the group becoming a trio 
In early 2007, the band released the song "Close Your Eyes" ("To You"), included on the soundtrack of the movie ″Waiting for a Miracle″. At the end of the summer, a music video was shot for the song "She's Lucky," directed again by Viktor Priduvalov. The song "You Recognize Her" was remade for the TV series "Happy Together" on TNT channel. The remade text was dedicated to the characters of the series, and the text noted their character traits.

In 2008, the band toured in the United States.

In June 2009, the band recorded and filmed a music video for the song "Petal", and at the end presented the soundtrack "Our Masha" for the movie "Our Masha and the Magic Nut".

In April 2010, the band recorded the single "It Can't Be" with the band's new soloist. In June 2010, the group became a trio: Alexander Berdnikov, Alexei Kabanov and Dmitry Pakulichev, due to the departure of Pavel Artemyev and Alexander Astashonok at their own initiative. At the end of 2010 the band released the song "This is not Spam", and in March 2011 took part in the project "The Star Factory. Return", in which graduates of the "Star Factory" of different years competed. The group joined the team of their producer Igor Matvienko.

Discography
Na veka (2003)
Dnevniki (2005)

OST's
"S dnem rozhdeniya Vika" - used in the Russian version OST of Grand Theft Auto: Vice City
"Naperegonki s vetrom" - used in the OST to television film "Kadetstvo"
"Ty uznaesh ee" - used in the OST of comedy television film "Schastlivy vmeste".
"Nasha Masha" - used in the OST of film "Nasha Masha i volshebniy oreh".
"Zakrit' glaza" - used in the OST of film "V ozhidanii chuda".

References

External links
 

Russian boy bands
Russian pop music groups
Russian rock music groups
Musical groups established in 2002
2002 establishments in Russia
Fabrika Zvyozd